Kursauli, also spelled Kursoli or Kursaoli, is a large village in Uttar Pradesh, India on the Lower Ganga Canal. 
It is about 3 km from Mandhana on the GT road, and about 7 km from IIT Kanpur along the path of the canal.  The road from Mandhana to Tikra village crosses the canal at a pool here. 
The population is 925 (503 males, 422 females, 2001 census).  It has a junior high and a primary school.

References

Villages in Kanpur Nagar district